TO1 (formerly known as TOO) (stylized in all caps) is a South Korean boy band formed by Mnet's 2019 reality show To Be World Klass.  The group debuted on April 1, 2020, with their first mini album Reason For Being: Benevolence with "Magnolia" serving as the title track. Member Chihoon left the group on April 30, 2022, and members Minsu, Jerome, and Woonggi left the group on June 17, 2022, while Daigo, Renta, and Yeojeong were added to the group.

History

2020: Debut and Road to Kingdom
On March 20, it was announced that the group will join Mnet's reality television competition Road to Kingdom. They were the second group eliminated in the seventh episode.

The group debuted with their first mini album Reason For Being: Benevolence on April 1, with the title track "Magnolia".

On July 15, the group released their second mini album Running TOOgether, with the title track "Count 1, 2."

On August 13, at the 2020 Soribada Awards, TOO won the "New Artist Award", their first rookie award since debut.

2021: Reformation, Re:Born, and Re:Alize
On January 13, CJ ENM and n.CH Entertainment were involved in management disputes, where CJ ENM reportedly terminated their management contract with n.CH Entertainment.  One day later, n.CH Entertainment responded to the disputes by stating that their contract was not formally signed for months, and that no expenses were paid since August 2020.

It was announced on March 28 that the group had changed its name from TOO to TO1.

TO1 made their re-debut with their first EP Re:Born on May 20, with the title track "Son of Beast".  The group will be managed under CJ ENM's music label, Wake One Entertainment.

On November 4, TO1 released their second EP Re:Alize, with the title track "No More X".

On December 28, Wake One announced that Woonggi would be taking a break from the group due to an anxiety disorder, and thus TO1 would temporarily continue with the remaining members.

2022: Line-up changes, Why Not?? and UP2U
On April 30, Wake One Entertainment released an official statement via TO1's fan cafe, announcing member Chihoon's departure from the group. On June 17, Wake One announced members Minsu, Jerome, and Woonggi's departure from TO1.  They also announced that Daigo, Renta, and Yeojeong will be joining TO1 as new members. Renta and Daigo participated in Produce 101 Japan Season 2, placing 13th and 16th respectively.

On July 28, TO1 released their third EP Why Not??, with the title track "Drummin'".

On November 23, TO1 released their fourth EP UP2U, with the title track "Freeze Tag'".

Members
 Donggeon (동건)
 Chan (찬)
 Jisu (지수)
 Jaeyun (재윤)
 J.You (제이유)
 Kyungho (경호)
 Daigo (다이고)
 Renta (렌타)
 Yeojeong (여정)

Former
 Chihoon (치훈)
 Minsu (민수)
 Jerome (제롬)
 Woonggi (웅기)

Timeline

Discography

Extended plays

Singles

Soundtrack appearances

Filmography
 To Be World Klass (Mnet, 2019)
 Road to Kingdom (Mnet, 2020)
 TOO Mystery (Mnet, 2020)
 Welcome 2 HOUSE (Mnet, 2021)
 To.1Day (Mnet, 2021)
 TO1 High School (Mnet, 2022)
 Freeze Tag Race (Mnet, 2022)

Videography

Awards and nominations

Notelist

References

External links
 

K-pop music groups
South Korean boy bands
South Korean dance music groups
Musical groups from Seoul
Musical groups established in 2020
2020 establishments in South Korea
South Korean pop music groups
Wake One Entertainment artists